Şakirpaşa railway station is a railway station in Seyhan, Adana, on the Adana-Mersin railway. The station consists of two side platforms serving two tracks. There is no station building, only a small shelter on each platform. TCDD Taşımacılık operates frequent regional rail service from Mersin to Adana, along with further service to İskenderun and İslahiye. Together with regional trains, two intercity trains stop at Şakirpaşa as well; the Erciyes Express to Kayseri and the Taurus Express to Konya.

References

External links
TCDD Taşımacılık
Station timetable (Intercity trains only)

Railway stations in Adana Province
Buildings and structures in Adana
Transport in Adana Province